Maria Geraldine Tambunan, known as Tamara Geraldine (born May 21, 1974), is an Indonesian presenter and author. She has released two books: Kamu Sadar, Saya Punya Alasan Untuk Selingkuh kan, Sayang? and Yuni Shara – 35 Cangkir Kopi.

Career
As a presenter, Tambunan has hosted many TV shows, including sports events. She has hosted the broadcast of the FIFA World Cup for several years. She hosted a gossip show called the Go Show on MNCTV.

She was awarded "Best Female Sport Presenter" for Panasonic Awards six years in a row, from 1999 until 2004.

Her career as a writer started from her habit of writing a diary. Her short stories were published in book form. Her first book, entitled Kamu Sadar, Saya Punya Alasan Untuk Selingkuh kan, Sayang?, contains a collection of 12 short stories. With photographer Darwis Triadi, she wrote a biography of her friend, Yuni Shara – 35 Cangkir Kopi.

Personal life
Tamara is married to a businessman from Vietnam, Tien Thinh Pham. They have one child.

Television

Book

References

External links
 Profil in KapanLagi.com
 Profil sebagai pembawa obor Olimpiade 2008 di samsungotr.teledata-vintedge.com

1974 births
People from Jakarta
Association football commentators
Living people